Sirāj al-Dīn Abū Ḥafṣ ʿUmar b. ʿAlī b. Aḥmad al-Shāfiʿī al-Miṣrī, commonly known as Ibn al-Mulaqqin (723–804/1323–1401), was a Sunni Egyptian scholar of Andalusian origin who was one of the leading Shafi'i jurists and hadith scholars of his time and known for his voluminous scholarship on Hadith and Fiqh. He was a prolific writer and an expert in the Arabic language.

Biography

Born
He was born 723 A.H which corresponds to the year 1323 in Andalous (now known as modern-day Spain). His father called Nur al-Din Ali was an Andalusian (Spanish) by origin and was from a village called Wadi Ash in the province of Granada in southern Spain, where he was a famous scholar in Arabic Grammar and then moved to West Africa where he taught Qu'ran until he had accumulated enough income to immigrate to Cairo and he studied under al-Isnawiy. His father then passed away when Ibn Mulaqqin was young so he was raised and taken care by Shaykh 'Isa al-Maghribi who was requested by his father to look after his family after his death. Al-Maghribi who was a Qu'ran teacher married ibn al-Mulaqqin's mother and therefore raised him to which he became known as Ibn al-Mulaqqin.

Education
He memorised the whole Quran at a young age and studied famous books like Umdatul Ahkam in hadith and al-Minhaj in fiqh. Whilst he was still young, he also heard over a thousand small books or compilations on hadith alone. Ibn al-mulaqqin's stepfather decided he should study the Maliki jurisprudence, but his friends and colleagues advised him that he to be educated in the Shafi'i jurisprudence due to the fact that there were greater opportunities for employment in the Mamluk Sultanate.

He travelled to Cairo, Alexandria, Aleppo, Damascus, Jerusalem, Hejaz (Mecca & Medina) and Yemen studying under numerous scholars and most prominently Shaykh al-Islam Taqi al-Din al-Subki and Jamal al-Din al-Isnawi.

Teaching
Ibn Al-Mulaqqin was appointed as the Shafi'i judge in the eastern district of Egypt and deputy chief judge in Cairo. He became a teacher at the mausoleum of al-Salih and taught Shafi'i jurisprudence there. He was given several preaching positions where he undertook them including at the al-Hakim mosque: and he taught hadith briefly in Dar al-Hadith (college of Hadith) in the Kaliliyya madrasa. But Ibn al-Mulaqqin dream was to become the Shafi'i chief judge of Egypt and he found connections through his friends and the future Sultan Barquq but that eventually caused him serious problems with his rival scholars who plotted against him, resulting in his brief imprisonment.

Students
He produced numerous scholars and some of his famous students include: 
 Wali al-Din al-'Iraqi the son of Zain al-Din al-'Iraqi
 Ibn Hajar Al-Asqalani
 Jalal ad-Din al-Mahalli
 Al-Maqrizi
 Ibn Nasir al-Dimishqi
 Ibn al-'Ajmi

Mysticism

Ibn Mulaqqin was a practising Sufi who transmitted the khirqa (a cloak placed on the head from master to disciple which indicates a spiritual lineage of Sufi tradition) and Ibn Mulaqqin claimed to have met the famous immortal saint called Al-Khadir.

Controversy over Ibn Mulaqqin
Despite being highly popular and respected by his contemporaries for his superb commentaries on legal sciences and due to his sheer volume of his writing skills, this sparked attention and led to some major criticism. The Syrian scholar, Ibn Hijji called him a sloppy scholar and accused him for plagiarism. Other Syrian scholars were also very critical of him dismissing him as a "copyist who makes many mistakes". Although such allegations were shut down by many major scholars of his time and those that came after him had defended his honour.

Downfall and Death
Ibn Mulaqqin had a passion for writing and absolutely loved books. By the end of his life, he wrote and accumulated a huge collection but unfortunately, lost them due to a fire breaking out which severely broke him down mentally and leaving him despondent and isolated. Ibn Hajar wrote that "Ibn Mulaqqin was of sound mind before his books burned, but afterwards his son had to hide him." He passed away on a Friday evening on the 15th of October in the year of 1401. He was buried in the Sufi cemetery near his father outside of the Bab al-Nasr, in Cairo.

Legacy
Ibn Mulaqqin stated that God gifted him with love for legal sciences especially in Hadith where he devoted most of his literary efforts. This love is quite evident based on his remarkable literary output. It is said he wrote over 300 unique works which most have not survived. He earned his spot as "one of the three great marvels of his age" the other two being Siraj al-Din al-Bulqini who was the greatest Shafi'i jurist, Zain al-Din al-'Iraqi who was the greatest hadith scholar and Ibn al-Mulaqqin being known for as the greatest prolific writer.

Works
Ibn Hajar Al-Asqalani said: "He was splendid in character and manners, looked and dressed well, he wrote extensively."
 Muqaddimah al-Badr al-Munir
 Umdat Ul-Muhtaj Ila Sharh Al-Minhaj
 Al-Mu'in Ala Tafahhum Il-Arba'in
 The Specifications Of The Messenger
 Al-I'lam Bi Fawaid Umdat Ul-Ahkam
 Al-Balghat fi Ahadith al-Ahkam
 Hada'iq al-Haqa'iq
 Tabaqat al-Muhadithin
 Al-'Uddah fi Ma'rifat rijal al-'Umdah
 Al-I'lam bi Fawa'id 'Umdat al-Ahkam
 Shawahid al-Tawdhih fi Sharh al-Jami' al-Sahih
 Sharh al-Arba'in al-Nawawiyah
 Sharh Zawa'id Muslim ibn al-hajjaj
 Sharh Zawa'id Abi Dawud 'Ala al-Sahih
 Al-Badr al-Munir fi Takhrij al-Ahadith wal Athar al-Waqi'at fi al-Sharh al-Kabir
 Khulasat al-Badr al-Munir
 Al-Muntaqa min Khulasat al-Badr al-Munir

See also 
 List of Ash'aris and Maturidis

Citations

References

External links
 (PDF) Ibn al-Mulaqqin | Nathan Hofer on Academia.edu
 Ibn al-Mulaqqin's page on Goodreads
 Mulaqqin's al-Tadhkirah by Mohammad Zahid on InkofFaith.com

1323 births
1401 deaths
Asharis
Shafi'is
Sunni Sufis
Hadith scholars
14th-century jurists
14th-century Muslim scholars of Islam
Sunni Muslim scholars of Islam